Elysia marginata is a marine gastropod in the family Plakobranchidae. It is known for its ability to regenerate its whole body and heart after autotomizing it from its head.

Distribution 
It was first observed off of the Hawaiian Islands and Tahiti.

Description 
E. marginata is described as having a green body with black and cream spots. It has tall, thin parapodia with a black band along its parapodial edge and a submarginal orange band. This species can be distinguished from other Indo-Pacific species by the white band found between the orange and black marginal bands.

Ecology 
Like other species such as Elysia ornata, Elysia marginata lives in shallow water and feeds on Bryopsis algae off the rocky bottom. E. marginata uses  kleptoplasty to sequester the chloroplasts from the algae it consumes. These chloroplasts are stored in Elysia marginata's highly branched digestive gland that is lined by cells that maintain the ingested chloroplasts over its entire body.

Unlike other sea slugs, which can only shed minor body parts, Elysia marginata and Elysia atroviridis can autotomize their heads completely from the rest of their body. E. marginata separates its head from the transverse groove over the course of several hours. Due to the slow nature of body separation, it is suggested that  body shedding is a controlled mechanism to eliminate parasites, as the time-consuming nature of this behavior is not an efficient way to avoid predators and imitated predators in studies did not induce autotomy. However, like other sacoglossans, E. marginata can survive solely by photosynthesis from kleptoplasty after separation from their digestive system.

Like other sea slugs, Sacoglossans are hermaphrodites and reproduce sexually. They produce dimorphic eggs with two distinct larval morphs: small eggs that develop into planktotrophic larvae and large eggs that develop into  lecithotrophic larvae that develop without needing to consume plankton.

See also 
 Elysia ornata

References 

Plakobranchidae
Gastropods described in 1871